Zikaras is a Lithuanian surname, its female form is Zikaraitė. Notable people with the surname include:

Juozas Zikaras (1881–1944), Lithuanian sculptor and artist
Teisutis Zikaras (1922–1991), Lithuanian-born Australian sculptor

Lithuanian-language surnames